The National Theater of Korea is a national theatre located in the neighborhood of Jangchung-dong, Jung-gu, South Korea. It is the first nationally managed theater in Asia.

Affiliation 
The National Theater of Korea was established in 1950 by the government of South Korea and hosts the National Theater Company of Korea, which performs both Korean and international plays, the National Changgeuk Company of Korea, which performs traditional Korean changgeuk, the National Dance Company of Korea, and the National Orchestra Company of Korea.

Facilities
Main Hall 'Hae' ("Hae" means "sun, ")
Small Hall 'Dal' ("Dal" means "moon, ")
Studio 'Byeol' ("Byeol" means "star, ")
KB Haneul Youth Theater ("Haneul" means "sky, ")
Culture Square

Events

Youth Performing Arts Festival
The Youth Performing Arts Festival of the National Theater, held every 
April until May, is a festival for youth. With the theme ‘Youth Embracing 
the Sky,’ the festival contributes to fostering the positive emotions of 
youth through programs allowing the experience of traditional dance music, 
musicals, mime, plays and dance of both Korean and international classics. 
In 2008 when the first festival was held, The Journey to Folksong with Suksun Ahn was performed for youth and multi-cultural families in culturally neglected areas. The Youth Performing Arts Festival is the signature event 
of the National Theater, with the goal of inspiring those 
who will be the future leaders of society and the performing arts.

The World Festival of National Theaters
Starting in 2007, the World Festival of National Theaters takes place from 
September to October every year. The festival promotes the mutual 
understanding of cultures from every country, whereby Korean audiences
can enjoy many excellent domestic and overseas performances. At the same 
time the National Theater of Korea can better solidify its position as the center 
of performing arts in Korea. Performances representing national theaters of 
various nations are on stage together with additional events like shows and 
exhibitions. National theaters, embassies and cultural centers of every 
country gather here for active cultural and artistic communication. The 
World Festival of National Theaters is the biggest festival hosted by the 
National Theater of Korea and is considered by some to be one of the greatest festivals in Korea.

The Saturday Cultural Plaza
Since 1993, the Saturday Cultural Plaza is the oldest open air performance 
by the National Theater. Various concerts and performances such as ballets, 
concerts of contemporary music and orchestra concerts are held in the 
open air cultural plaza every May to September, on Saturdays at 6:00PM. 
So far, 350 thousand people have visited the Saturday Cultural Plaza. 
From 2002 to 2007 the Plaza was sponsored by Renault-Samsung Motors 
and starting in 2008 by KB Kookmin Bank, which received the Mecenat 
Award in 2008. This activity aspires to serve as a model of partnership between 
art and business.

Midday Concert
The Midday Concert was designed to show the potential of traditional 
classical music so the public can easily understand Korean music’s past and 
present. Folksongs, contemporary music, and original sound tracks of soap
operas and films are rearranged and modernized by the National Orchestra. Commentaries on each work by the artistic director Byeongki Hwang 
in order to enrich the concert’s content.

Seasons Festival
National Theater of Korea provides various events every spring, summer, fall and winter.

Shows
 August 2010: Actors Lee Joon-gi and Ju Ji-hoon co-starred in military musical, Voyage of Life. The musical, to commemorate the 60th anniversary of the Korean War, was co-produced by the Ministry of National Defense and Korea Musical Theatre Association. It ran from 21 to 29 August the Theater.
 January 2013: The Ministry of National Defense again with Korea Musical Theatre Association produced another military musical The Promise, to commemorate the 60th anniversary of the signing of an armistice. It ran from 9 to 20 January at the Theater, starring actors Ji Hyun-woo, Kim Mu-yeol, Jung Tae-woo; as well as singers Leeteuk of Super Junior, Yoon Hak of Supernova, and Lee Hyun of 8Eight. The musical is centered on a group of soldiers who keeps a promise made to each other during the 6.25 war.

See also
Contemporary culture of South Korea
Korean art
Korean theater
List of concert halls
 Yuk Young-soo, First Lady of South Korea and spouse of Park Chung-hee – she was assassinated at the theater during a Gwangbokjeol (Independence Day) ceremony on August 15, 1974.

References

External links

Official site

Jung District, Seoul
Korea
Theatres in South Korea
1950 establishments in South Korea
Theatres completed in 1950
Tourist attractions in Seoul